Note: Jaromír Spal may refer to a Czechoslovak linguist (1913-1990).

Jaromír Spal (1916–1981) was a Czechoslovak film actor.

Selected filmography
 Bohemian Rapture (1947)
 Silent Barricade (1949)

References

Bibliography
 https://slavistik-portal.de/en/datenpool/czechling-db.html?data=1992CZ019733&title=Odesel-Jaromir-Spal
 Peter Cowie. World Filmography 1968''. Tantivy Press, 1968.

External links

1916 births
1981 deaths
Czechoslovak male actors